Grabbi is an Italian surname. Notable people with the surname include:

Corrado Grabbi (born 1975), Italian footballer
Giuseppe Grabbi (1901–1970), Italian footballer

See also
Gabbi

Italian-language surnames